"Man on the Silver Mountain" is the debut single by Rainbow and the first track of their debut album, Ritchie Blackmore's Rainbow, written by guitarist Ritchie Blackmore and vocalist Ronnie James Dio.

Reception 
Brad Sanders of The A.V. Club wrote that, although the song's lyrics are essentially meaningless, the way that Dio sings them "sounds awesome".  After Dio's death, Rob Halford performed a cover of the song and said it "captures the things I personally love in metal tracks".

Charts

References

1975 debut singles
1975 songs
Rainbow (rock band) songs
Songs written by Ritchie Blackmore
Songs written by Ronnie James Dio